Pam & Tommy is an American biographical drama television miniseries chronicling the marriage between actress Pamela Anderson and Mötley Crüe drummer Tommy Lee, played by Lily James and Sebastian Stan, respectively, during the period their unauthorised sex tape was made public. Based on the 2014 Rolling Stone article "Pam and Tommy: The Untold Story of the World's Most Infamous Sex Tape" by Amanda Chicago Lewis, the series was created for Hulu by Robert Siegel, and is produced by Point Grey Pictures and Annapurna Television.

The series development was announced in 2018, with James Franco attached to direct the miniseries and play Lee. It was given a series order in December 2020 by Hulu, announcing James to play Anderson and Stan to replace Franco following the latter's departure from the project. Casting announcements were made throughout 2021 and filming took place in Los Angeles between April and July 2021.

The first three episodes of Pam & Tommy premiered on Hulu on February 2, 2022, and were directed by Craig Gillespie, with the rest of the episodes debuting weekly. The miniseries received generally positive reviews from critics, with praise going towards the cast’s performances. It received ten Primetime Emmy Award nominations, including Outstanding Limited Or Anthology Series and acting nominations for James, Stan, and Rogen.

Premise
Pam & Tommy depicts the turbulent three-year marriage between Pamela Anderson and Tommy Lee, with particular emphasis on the theft and illegal distribution of an infamous sex tape the couple recorded privately during their honeymoon.

Cast and characters

Main
 Lily James as Pamela Anderson
 Sebastian Stan as Tommy Lee
 Nick Offerman as Uncle Miltie
 Seth Rogen as Rand Gauthier
 Taylor Schilling as Erica Gauthier

Recurring
 Pepi Sonuga as Melanie
 Andrew Dice Clay as Butchie
 Mozhan Marnò as Gail Chwatsky
 Fred Hechinger as Seth Warshavsky
 Paul Ben-Victor as Richard Alden, Pam and Tommy's lawyer
 Mike Seely as Hugh Hefner
 Medalion Rahimi as Danielle, Erica's girlfriend
 Don Harvey as Anthony Pellicano, a private investigator
 Adam Ray as Jay Leno

Guest
 Jason Mantzoukas as the voice of Tommy's penis (in "I Love You, Tommy")
 Maxwell Caulfield as Bob Guccione, the owner of Penthouse (in "Uncle Jim and Aunt Susie In Duluth")
 John Billingsley as the Penthouse defense counsel (in "Pamela in Wonderland")
 Brian Huskey as Gambler in Debt (in "Destroyer of Worlds")
 Clint Howard as himself playing his character Schmitz in Barb Wire (in "Destroyer of Worlds")

Production

Development
The series was first announced in 2018, with Seth Rogen and Evan Goldberg developing the project under their production company Point Grey Pictures and James Franco attached to direct the miniseries and play Tommy Lee. By December 2020, Franco had left the series and it was announced that Hulu had greenlit the project with an eight-episode limited series order. Craig Gillespie was set to direct with Robert D. Siegel writing and Rogen and Goldberg executive producing the miniseries. Tatiana S. Riegel, a frequent collaborator of Gillespie's, was attached as editor. Pamela Anderson refused to get involved, expressing disbelief that "people are still capitalizing off that thing" that "was painful enough the first time around", even declining to read a letter Lily James sent asking for her blessing; Lee was also not involved with the series but he supported it. The series is based on a 2014 Rolling Stone article describing the story of how Anderson and Lee's sex tape was stolen and released. Siegel found it hard to believe the events had not been the subject of a film or series previously, with the producers optioning the rights to the article to serve as the basis of the series. Co-showrunners Siegel and D.V. DeVincentis noted that most of the "basic plot beats" came from that article and "the basic mechanics" of the events "was pretty much what happened", with the conversations between the characters dramatized.

Casting
Alongside the series order announcement, Lily James and Sebastian Stan were cast to play the titular characters, with Rogen also cast in a main role. In April 2021, Nick Offerman and Taylor Schilling were announced as main cast members, with Pepi Sonuga, Andrew Dice Clay, Spenser Granese and Mozhan Marnò in recurring roles. In June 2021, Fred Hechinger was announced as a part of the cast in a recurring role. In January 2022, it was revealed that Jason Mantzoukas was voicing Tommy Lee's penis.

Filming 
The series began filming on April 5, 2021, in Los Angeles and finished on July 30, 2021. The two main actors went through long make-up processes to closely resemble their characters. Lily James wore a prosthetic forehead, chest, dentures, blue contact lenses, and a blonde wig. Sebastian Stan spent hours getting up to 30 tattoos painted on him, grew out and dyed his hair, and wore brown contact lenses, a prosthetic penis, and pierced nipples. Their wardrobe was not custom made, but purchased second-hand based on the clothes Anderson and Lee wore during that period of 1995–1998.

Controversy 
In the 2023 Netflix documentary "Pamela: A Love Story" it was revealed that Pamela Anderson and her family were not consulted about the production of the series. Critics, journalists, and academics posited that the series was profiting off of Anderson's trauma without her consent, and likely doing further harm to her and her family. "Pamela: A Love Story" verified those claims, in Anderson's own words.

Producers of the series were able to develop the series without her participation, permission, or consent by optioning the rights to an article published by Rolling Stone in 2014. Some critics felt that this was a similar violation of privacy that mirrored the sex tape originally being stolen and distributed without Anderson's and Lee's consent.

Further, the web series is marketed as "the incredible true story" of the sex tape but much is fictionalized, according to Anderson and family.

Episodes

Release
Pam & Tommy premiered on February 2, 2022, on Hulu, with the first three episodes and the rest debuting on a weekly basis. The series was also released simultaneously internationally on Disney+ under the Star hub (including Hotstar in India), and on Star+ in Latin America.

Reception

Audience viewership 
According to Parrot Analytics, which looks at consumer engagement in consumer research, streaming, downloads, and on social media, Pam & Tommy was the 4th most in-demand new show, during the week of March 12, 2022 to March 18, 2022. According to Whip Media, Pam & Tommy was the 10th most watched original series across all platforms in the United States, during the week of February 6, 2022, and the 6th during the week of March 13, 2022.

Critical reception 
Pam & Tommy received positive reviews from critics. The review aggregator website Rotten Tomatoes reports a 78% approval rating based on 102 reviews, with an average rating of 7.3/10. The site's critical consensus reads: "Pam & Tommy sometimes undercuts its own critique of cultural voyeurism with lurid stylization, but Lily James' performance gives this sleazy opus an undeniable heart." On Metacritic, the series has a score of 70 out of 100, based on 42 reviews, indicating "generally favorable reviews."

James Poniewozik of The New York Times found the show "consistently entertaining" and praised the performances of the actors, calling James' portrayal a "sneakily complex performance," and complimented the narrative alongside the practical effects. Alison Foreman of Mashable praised the performances of the whole cast, especially James and Stan, complimented the soundtrack and pace, and stated that the show keeps "the entertainment value high." Inkoo Kang of The Washington Post stated that the transformation of James and Stan is a "casting and makeup coup," while saying that the production is admirable due to its "madeleine-esque needle drops to its relish in the baggy tackiness of so much ’90s fashion.," although claiming that the show exploits Anderson's story. Alec Bojalad of Den of Geek reviewed Pam & Tommy positively, stating that James as Anderson and Stan as Lee are "excellent choices," praising the development of the characters, and saying that "it transports viewers into the mind of a real woman enduring real internet-era trauma."

Lucy Mangan of The Guardian rated the miniseries 4 out of 5 stars, saying that Pam & Tommy is a "warm, funny, intelligent and rather moving drama," while calling the performances from Lily James as Anderson and Sebastian Stan as Lee "astonishing," stating that "each achieve the feat of uncannily resembling – aesthetically, vocally, and in every mannerism – the real-life people, without descending into mimicry."  Abhishek Srivastava of The Times of India rated the series 4 out of 5 stars, praised the performances of the actors and Craig Gillespie's direction, and stated that the miniseries manages to provide a captivating story. Martin Brown of Common Sense Media rated the series 3 out of 5 stars, writing, "In real life, Anderson and Tommy Lee came off as slightly more sympathetic than they do in this version of the story, which focuses more on the sensational aspects of the story and characters than on why they might be relevant to viewers nearly 25 years later."

Clint Worthington of RogerEbert.com rated the series 2.5 out of 4 stars and said that the series is entertaining, called the performances of the actors "strong" and the direction "stylish," but found that the show is a violation of privacy that is "filtered through the glossy lens of prestige TV." Laura Martin of BBC rated the show 2 out of 5 stars, complimented the performances of James and Stan, and found some scenes amusing, but stated that the show exploits the traumatic personal life of Anderson.

Accolades

Further reading 
 
 
 
 Fred J. Lincoln, Oral History Interview, Leather Archives & Museum

Notes

See also
 Tabloid television
Dark Side of the 90's

References

External links
 
 Amanda Chicago Lewis. (2014) "Pam and Tommy: The Untold Story of the World's Most Infamous Sex Tape", Rolling Stone article that was the basis for the series

2020s American drama television miniseries
2020s American romance television series
2020s romantic drama television series
2022 American television series debuts
2022 American television series endings
American biographical series
American romantic drama television series
Cultural depictions of Pamela Anderson
English-language television shows
Hulu original programming
Mötley Crüe
Television duos
Television series about actors
Television series about marriage
Television series based on actual events
Television series by Lionsgate Television
Television series set in 1995
Television series set in 1996
Television shows filmed in Los Angeles
Television shows set in Los Angeles
Works about the Internet
Works based on periodical articles
Television series set in the 1990s
Primetime Emmy Award-winning television series
Works about pornography